The opening ceremony of the 1992 Summer Olympics took place in the evening on Saturday 25 July 1992 in the Estadi Olímpic Lluís Companys, Barcelona, Spain. As mandated by the Olympic Charter, the proceedings combined the formal and ceremonial opening of this international sporting event, including welcoming speeches, hoisting of the flags and the parade of athletes, with an artistic spectacle to showcase the host nation's culture and history. The Games were officially opened by King of Spain Juan Carlos I at 22:20  CEST (UTC+2 ).

Greek mezzo-soprano, Agnes Baltsa, sang "Romiossini" as the Olympic flag was taken around the stadium.  Alfredo Kraus later sang the Olympic Hymn in both Catalan and Spanish as the flag was hoisted. The Olympic flame cauldron was lit by a flaming arrow, shot by Paralympic archer Antonio Rebollo. The arrow had been lit by the flame of the Olympic Torch. Rebollo overshot the cauldron which was the original design of the lighting scheme.

There were two main musical themes for the 1992 Games. One was Barcelona, composed five years earlier by Freddie Mercury and sung as a duet with Montserrat Caballé. Due to Mercury's death eight months earlier, the duo was unable to perform the song during the opening ceremony. A recording of the song instead played over a travelogue of the city at the start of the broadcast. Caballé performed at the end with other Spanish and Catalan opera singers various Spanish operatic hits. The second theme was Amigos Para Siempre, composed by Andrew Lloyd Webber and Don Wright. In the opening ceremony, it was performed by a chorus while an Olympic flag covered the athletes. Flags covering the athletes has been a motif that was used in the 2000 and 2004 opening ceremonies. This second song was a favorite of the then IOC President Juan Antonio Samaranch and was played at his funeral.

Parade of nations

Brunei participated in the Opening Ceremony, but its delegation consisted of only one official. This also occurred in the 1988 Games  Afghanistan did not send their athletes to compete, but the country took part in the Parade of Nations. Liberia and Somalia also participated in the Opening Ceremony, but its accredited athletes (five and two, respectively) did not enter to compete.

Anthems
 National Anthem of Catalonia
 National Anthem of Spain
 Olympic Hymn – Alfredo Kraus

TV coverage

References

Opening Ceremony, 1992 Summer Olympics
Olympics opening ceremonies
Ceremonies in Spain